"Motown Junk" is a non-album single and the second single by Welsh alternative rock band Manic Street Preachers. It was released on 21 January 1991.

Release 

"Motown Junk" was released on 21 January 1991 by record label Heavenly, the band's first release on this label. It peaked at number 94 on the UK Singles Chart. Despite its relatively poor charting, the single gained the band much attention from the press.

In 2008, the band added a "Johnny Boy Anniversary Mix" free embedded version to their official website, which featured spoken dialogue by Richey Edwards.

In 2011, Heavenly re-released "Motown Junk" to sell at the Manic Street Preachers gig on 21 May 2011 and at the Berwick Independent Marker.

The track has long been a live favourite throughout their career.

Content 

The title track shows the band during their pinnacle of iconoclastic attitude, such as in the lyric, "I laughed when Lennon got shot". The "Motown" in the title refers to famed 1960s and 1970s label Motown Records. The song also displayed their diverse cultural scope with a Public Enemy-sampling intro and an outro sample of The Skids.

Mark Corcoran of NARC adjudged the song to pertain to the punk metal style.

Both B-sides featured on the single, "Sorrow 16" and "We Her Majesty's Prisoners", were on the later singles "Slash 'n' Burn" and "You Love Us", respectively, both from the band's debut album Generation Terrorists (1992). The single was the band's first from their then record label Heavenly Records.

The single's cover features a watch recovered from the Hiroshima bomb site depicting the exact moment of detonation.

The outro of the song samples the outro of the single 'Charles' by the Skids with James Dean Bradfield often citing Stuart Adamson as one of his influences.

Legacy
In 2011, NME ranked the song number three on their list of the 10 greatest Manic Street Preachers songs, and in 2022, The Guardian ranked the song number 12 on their list of the 30 greatest Manic Street Preachers songs. NME included the song at no. 244 in their list of 500 Greatest Songs of All Time, with the description: "They were still stencilling their own t-shirts and playing to half-full pub back rooms, but this icon-skewering single showed that the Manics meant business."

Track listing 

 CD version

 12" vinyl version

 7" vinyl version

Charts

References

Sources

External links 

 BBC interview about the song
 Uncut article which mentions the single

1991 singles
Manic Street Preachers songs
1990 songs
Songs written by James Dean Bradfield
Songs written by Nicky Wire
Songs written by Sean Moore (musician)
Songs written by Richey Edwards